In 1930 the "Association Française des Professeurs de Tennis (AFPT)" held its first pro tournament, titled "Championnat International de France Professionnel" (French Pro Championships) June 18–22, 1930, and is considered as a part of the professional major from 1927 to 1967 till the advent of Open Era. The tournament only had a men's draw.

From 1930 the French Pro Championship were always played at Paris, on outdoor clay at Roland Garros except from 1963 to 1967 where it was held at Stade Pierre de Coubertin on indoor wood. Ken Rosewall holds the record for 8 wins overall and 7 consecutive wins.

There was a professional tournament at Roland Garros in 1952 held on a round robin basis, in which Segura finished first, winning the decider over Pancho Gonzales, Kramer third, and Budge fourth. There is no indication yet of recognition by the AFPT as the official French Pro.

There were tournaments played on indoor cement in 1950 and 1953 at the Palais des Sports. They are listed in the table below, but there is no suggestion that they were seen as official French Pro titles.

Champions

Singles 

Notes:

Doubles 

Source:

Bristol Cup and other French professional events

Before 1930 some tournaments were sometimes labelled "Professional Championships of France": the Bristol Cup (held from 1920 to 1932), the most important pro tournament in the world in the 1920s, was sometimes referred as the French Pro as well as the World Pro tournament held at Deauville in 1925. Therefore, two different tournaments were both considered as French Pro Championships in 1925 (World Pro at Deauville and Bristol Cup at Cannes) and from 1930 to 1932 (Roland Garros and Bristol Cup at Beaulieu).

Records

Men's singles
Source: French Pro Championships, (1930–68): The Tennisbase included

See also 
 French Pro Championship draws – Professional Era (1930–1967)
 U.S. Pro Tennis Championships
 Wembley Championships
 Major professional tennis tournaments before the Open Era

References

Bibliography

 

Major tennis tournaments
Defunct tennis tournaments in France
Professional tennis tournaments before the Open Era